Gjesåsen is a largely agricultural village area located in the municipality of Åsnes in Innlandet county, Norway. The village area lies at the east end of the lake Gjesåssjøen. Gjesåsen Church is located here.

References

Åsnes
Villages in Innlandet